Beatrice Colen (January 10, 1948 – November 18, 1999) was an American television and film actress. Her most famous roles were Marsha Simms on Happy Days and Etta Candy on Wonder Woman.

Early life
Colen was born to Anne and Bruce D Colen in New York City, New York. Both of her parents were of German Jewish descent. She was the granddaughter of playwright George S. Kaufman.

Career
Starting in the 1970s, Colen landed roles early in her career in both film and television. On Happy Days, she starred as Milwaukee carhop Marsha Simms in seasons 1-3 and 5.

She was the first actress to portray Etta Candy in the live action adaptation of the DC comic book series Wonder Woman. After the pilot, she appeared only during the series' first season (1976–77), which were set during World War II.  When the series was retooled and reset in modern times, the character was dropped.

Colen acted in such television film as Schoolboy Father (1980), Brave New World, and in feature films such as Lifeguard, High Anxiety, American Pop, and Who's that Girl.

She also guest starred on a number of TV shows such as The Odd Couple, All in the Family, The Love Boat, Kolchak: The Night Stalker (1974, premiere episode: "The Ripper"), Barney Miller (1981, episode: "The Rainmaker" and the 1975 episode: “Grand Hotel”), The Wonder Years, and Baywatch.

Her final television appearance before retiring was in a 1997 episode of Nickelodeon's The Secret World of Alex Mack.

Personal life and death
Colen was married to Patrick Cronin on October 23, 1977, and together they had two sons, James Cronin and Charlie Cronin.
She died of lung cancer on November 18, 1999, in Los Angeles, California, at the Cedars-Sinai Medical Center. Colen died on the opening night of Brentwood High School's production of The Man Who Came to Dinner, which was written by her grandfather, Pulitzer Prize-winning playwright George S. Kaufman, and which starred her son, James Cronin, in the title role of Sheridan Whiteside. Her memorial service was held at Saint James Episcopal Church in Los Angeles ten days later.

Filmography

References

External links

1948 births
1999 deaths
20th-century American actresses
American film actresses
American people of German-Jewish descent
American television actresses
Actresses from New York City
Jewish American actresses
Deaths from lung cancer in California
20th-century American Jews